Interstate 820 (I-820) is a loop of I-20 in Fort Worth, Texas, of approximately  around the city and some of its suburbs. Exit numbers begin at its intersection with I-20 in southwest Fort Worth, and continue in a clockwise direction around the city until it ends at its intersection with I-20 in southeast Fort Worth. A portion of I-820 in the northeast quadrant is cosigned with State Highway 121 (SH 121) as well as SH 183.

The northwest segment of the loop is officially designated as the Jim Wright Freeway after former United States House Speaker Jim Wright. However, the name is not commonly used, the colloquial reference by the general public is "Loop 820", or simply just 820. Additionally, the area of the highway is given based on its direction from downtown Fort Worth, for example: "North Loop 820" or "East Loop 820", respectively specify the areas to the north or east of downtown. These colloquial designations do not refer to the direction of traffic flow.

Route description
I-820 begins in the southwestern Fort Worth at an interchange with I-20. It heads north from this interchange to a junction with State Highway Spur 580 (Spur 580) before reaching I-30 at a stack interchange. Continuing to the north, the Interstate begins to turn to the northeast as it approaches Lake Worth. It passes near Naval Air Station Joint Reserve Base Fort Worth as it passes over Lake Worth. I-820 passes through the city of Lake Worth briefly with junctions at SH 199 and Farm to Market Road 1220 (FM 1220) before reentering Fort Worth city limits. Continuing to the northeast, a junction with Business U.S. Route 287-P (Bus. US 287-P) provides access to Fort Worth Meacham International Airport. At an interchange with FM 156 in the city of Saginaw, I-820 begins to head toward the east. Continuing east, I-820 has a junction with I-35W at a stack interchange. The freeway enters the city limits of Haltom City at North Beach Street and has an interchange with U.S. Route 377 (US 377) before entering North Richland Hills. As it passes through North Richland Hills, the freeway turns toward the southeast briefly before turning back toward the east at SH 26. As it enters Hurst, the freeway has an interchange with a concurrent SH 121 and SH 183. I-820 begins to head south after the interchange, now running concurrently with SH 121 and SH 183. At an interchange with SH 10, SH 183 leaves the concurrency to the west. At the next exit, SH 121 leaves I-820 toward the southwest. Continuing toward the south, I-820 leaves Hurst and reenters the Fort Worth city limits. Heading south through eastern Fort Worth, I-820 has a second junction with I-30, also at a stack interchange. After the interchange, the freeway continues south to a junction at Lancaster Avenue SH 180; and Rosedale Street Spur  303 near Lake Arlington. I-820 begins to follow the western shore of Lake Arlington to an interchange with US 287. I-820 and US 287 both continue to the south to an interchange with I-20 at the end of I-820.

History
The highway was first conceived in 1949 as a beltway around Fort Worth. It was originally designated from I-20 (now I-30) southeast, east, north, and west to I-35W. On April 18, 1963, I-820 was designated to use existing State Highway Loop 217 (Loop 217) from SH 121 and SH 183 to Hulen Street, while the section of Loop 217 from Hulen Street to US 377 was designated as State Highway Loop 820 (Loop 820). On September 1, 1965, another section of Loop 820 from I-20 north and east to I-35W was designated. This section of Loop 820 from I-20 north and east to I-35W became part of I-820 on January 21, 1969, making I-820 a full loop. The first section to open ran from McCart Avenue to US 377 at a cost of $11 million. On May 13, 1977, the remainder of Loop 820 became part of an extended SH 183. The southern leg of the loop was redesignated as I-20 on December 2, 1971, and finished construction in 1982, completing a continuous loop around Fort Worth. Despite no longer being officially designated as I-820 on the southern arc (which is officially part of I-20), it is still unofficially referred to as Loop 820 for business purposes, and the frontage roads and business addresses along the southern arc still bear the names "SW Loop 820" and "SE Loop 820".

The loop is often considered the most congested road in North Texas, with the interchanges at Rufe Snow Drive, Holiday Lane, and Denton Highway (US 377) being named the first, second, and third worst, respectively, in 2010.

North Tarrant Express

The North Tarrant Express (NTE) was a construction project that was supposed to add additional lanes, add high occupancy toll lanes, add continuous frontage roads, and reconstruct the interchange with I-35W and various other interchanges between I-35W and SH 121/SH 183. However, this plan was modified, with the additional mainlanes not being built, though TxDOT plans to widen the freeway by no later than 2030. The NTE began construction in October 2010 and was completed in June 2015.

Exit list

References

External links

Interstate Guide: I-820
I-820 info page—from dfwfreeways.info

Transportation in Tarrant County, Texas
20-8
20-8
8
820